Yevgeny Nikitin may refer to:

 Yevgeny Nikitin (bass-baritone), Russian bass-baritone opera singer
 Yevgeny Nikitin (footballer) (born 1993), Belarusian football player